Gabonese cuisine is the cooking traditions, practices, foods and dishes associated with Gabon, a sovereign state on the west coast of Central Africa. French cuisine is prevalent as a notable influence, and in larger cities various French specialties are available. In rural areas, food staples such as cassava, rice and yams are commonly used.

Meats, when available, include chicken and fish, and bush meats such as antelope, wild boar and monkey. Sauces are often used, with hot red-pepper berbere paste being a common example.

Fruits include bananas, papayas, guavas, mangoes, pineapples, coconuts, avocado and peanuts. Plantains, tomatoes, corn, and eggplant are also used.

Common foods and dishes
 Atanga (Dacryodes edulis), sometimes called "bush butter", is a firm fruit that is boiled and often used as a spread on bread
 Beignets, a deep-fried pastry, are very common
 Brochettes
 Dried meats, particularly in rural areas
 Fufu, a dish made from pounded cassava
 Nyembwe, chicken with pine nuts
 Mustard chicken with garlic, onions, and lemon juice
 Meat stews
 Seafood
 Smoked fish
 Baked bananas, coated with bread crumbs and served with sour cream and brown sugar
 Gari, a cassava flour prepared as a porridge
 Plantains, whole, crushed and mashed

See also

 African cuisine
 West African cuisine

References

 
Central African cuisine